Ligamentous laxity, or ligament laxity, is a cause of chronic body pain characterized by loose ligaments. When this condition affects joints in the entire body, it is called generalized joint hypermobility, which occurs in about ten percent of the population, and may be genetic. Loose ligaments can appear in a variety of ways and levels of severity. It also does not always affect the entire body. One could have loose ligaments of the feet, but not of the arms.

Someone with ligamentous laxity, by definition, has loose ligaments. Unlike other, more pervasive diseases, the diagnosis does not require the presence of loose tendons, muscles or blood vessels, hyperlax skin or other connective tissue problems. In heritable connective tissue disorders associated with joint hypermobility (such as Marfan syndrome and Ehlers–Danlos syndrome types I–III, VII, and XI), the joint laxity usually is apparent before adulthood. However, age of onset and extent of joint laxity are variable in Marfan syndrome, and joint laxity may be confined to the hands alone, as in Ehlers–Danlos syndrome type I. In addition, ligamentous laxity may appear in conjunction with physical co-ordination conditions such as dyspraxia.

Presentation

While ligamentous laxity may be genetic and affect an individual from a very early age, it can also be the result of an injury. Injuries, especially those involving the joints, invariably damage ligaments either by stretching them abnormally or even tearing them.

Loose or lax ligaments in turn are not capable of supporting joints as effectively as healthy ones, making the affected individual prone to further injury as well as compensation for the weakness using other parts of the body. Affected individuals may improve over time and lose some of their juvenile hyperlaxity as they age. Individuals over age 40 often have recurrent joint problems and almost always have chronic pain. Back patients with ligamentous laxity in the area of the spine may also experience osteoarthritis and disc degeneration.

In the case of extreme laxity, or hypermobility, affected individuals often have a decreased ability to sense joint position, which can contribute to joint damage. The resulting poor limb positions can lead to the acceleration of degenerative joint conditions. Many hypermobility patients have osteoarthritis, disorders involving nerve compression, chondromalacia patellae, excessive anterior mandibular movement, mitral valve prolapse, uterine prolapse and varicose veins.

Symptoms
Arthralgia, or symptoms such as frequent sprained ankles, shoulder dislocations, knee effusions and back problems are common among individuals with ligamentous laxity. Affected individuals are also prone to bone dislocation, and those with a sedentary job often report back pain. In addition, people may experience referred pain, that is, pain in an area of the body away from the injured or otherwise affected site.

Individuals with extremely lax, or hypermobile joints, can be identified by their ability to bend their elbows, knees or hips past a position of neutrality. They may also be able to easily touch their hands flat to the floor while bending forward from the waist. The ability to touch the thumb to the forearm is also common.

Referred pain is created by ligamentous laxity around a joint, but is felt at some distance from the injury. (Pain will not only occur at the site of the injury and loose ligaments, but may also be referred to other parts of the body.) These painful points that refer pain elsewhere are called trigger points, and will be dealt with later. Abnormal joint movement also creates many "protective actions" by adjacent tissues. Muscles will contract in spasm in an attempt to pull the joint back to the correct location or stabilize it to protect it from further damage.

When this occurs in the back, orthopedic surgeons will often try to reduce vertebral instability by fusing the vertebrae with bone and/or metal fixation.

Feet
Those who have loose ligaments in the legs and feet may appear to have flat feet. While their feet have an arch when not supporting weight, when stood upon, the arch will flatten. This is because the loose ligaments cannot support the arch in the way that they should. This can make walking and standing painful and tiring.
Pain will usually occur in the feet and lower legs, but can also spread to the back due to abnormal standing and walking habits. Wearing shoes that have good arch support can help minimize the discomfort. The underlying problem, however, is not solved by wearing shoes with arch supports, or worsened by wearing shoes without arch support. There is currently no cure for the condition.

In addition, people with ligamentous laxity often have clumsy or deliberate gaits, owing to the body having to overcompensate for the greater amount of energy required to offset the weakened ligaments. The feet may be spread apart at a wide angle, and the knees may flex backwards slightly after each stride.

Those who have this disease may experience sprained ankles more frequently than other people.

Cause
In most people, ligaments (which are the tissues that connect bones to each other) are naturally tight in such a way that the joints are restricted to 'normal' ranges of motion. This creates normal joint stability. If muscular control does not compensate for ligamentous laxity, joint instability may result. The trait is almost certainly hereditary, and is usually something the affected person would just be aware of, rather than a serious medical condition. However, if there is widespread laxity of other connective tissue, then this may be a sign of Ehlers–Danlos syndrome.

Ligamentous laxity may also result from injury, such as from a vehicle accident. It can result from whiplash and be overlooked for years by doctors who are not looking for it, despite the chronic pain that accompanies the resultant spinal instability. Ligamentous laxity will show up on an upright magnetic resonance imaging (MRI), the only kind of MRI that will show soft tissue damage. It can be seen in standing stress radiographs in flexion, extension, and neutral views as well, and also digital motion X-ray, or DMX.

An advantage to having lax ligaments and joints is the ability to withstand pain from hyperextension; however, this is also a disadvantage as a lack of perceived pain can prevent a person from removing the ligament from insult, leading to ligament damage. People with hypermobile joints (or "double-jointed" people), almost by definition, have lax ligaments.

References

External links 

Skeletal disorders